Formula of Love: O+T=<3 is the third Korean studio album (sixth overall) by South Korean girl group Twice. It was released on November 12, 2021, by JYP Entertainment and Republic Records. It follows the release of the group's first English-language single, "The Feels".

Selling over 700,000 units during its pre-order period, the album became Twice's best-selling album to date; surpassing a record previously held by More & More (2020). Primarily a disco-pop record, the album encapsulates a handful of genres such as Latin pop, hip hop, R&B, and synthpop. It also debuted at number three on the Billboard 200 with 66,000 album-equivalent units, becoming the group's fourth and highest entry on the chart.

Background 
Following Eyes Wide Open (2020), Formula of Love: O+T=<3 is Twice's third Korean-language studio album. It is the group's third release in 2021, following their tenth Korean extended play, Taste of Love, and third Japanese album, Perfect World.<ref name="fol">Citations concerning releases prior to Formula of Love: O+T=<3:
 {{Cite magazine |last=Bowenbank |first=Starr |date=October 9, 2021 |title=TWICE Announces Release Date for Third Album Formula of Love: O+T=<3' |magazine=Billboard |url=https://www.billboard.com/articles/columns/k-town/9642834/twice-third-album-formula-of-love-release-date |url-status=live |access-date=October 10, 2021 |archive-url=https://web.archive.org/web/20211008202216/https://www.billboard.com/articles/columns/k-town/9642834/twice-third-album-formula-of-love-release-date/ |archive-date=October 8, 2021}}
 
 
 
 
 </ref>Formula of Love: O+T=<3 was first teased by Twice member Chaeyoung on September 13, 2021, in the behind-the-scenes video for her photoshoot with OhBoy! magazine, although at the time, not much was known about it. At the end of the music video of Twice's first English single, "The Feels", a full-length album scheduled to be released in November 2021 was teased. The name of the album and its release date were revealed on October 8. A preview showing the four versions of the physical album was posted on October 12. Pre-orders began later that day. On October 29, the album's track listing was announced.

 Composition Formula of Love: O+T=<3 is a fifteen-track album that features genres such as city pop, dance-pop, deep house, disco, hip hop, Latin pop, nu-disco, reggaeton, and R&B. Twice members Nayeon, Jihyo, Dahyun, and Chaeyoung took part in writing some songs from the album. In an interview with the Associated Press, Jihyo revealed that the death of a houseplant was her inspiration for writing the song "Cactus".

 Songs Formula of Love: O+T=<3 opens with its title track, "Scientist", a "funky" dance-pop song, blending elements of synth-pop and deep house by featuring '80s-inspired synths with "groovy" bass lines in its production. Lyrically, it delves into the theme of love and studying the fundamentals of romance, and by using science-related word play, they declare there is no right answer to love. It is followed by two English songs, "Moonlight" and "Icon"; with the former channeling '80s nostalgia through its "tropical disco vibes" and "cute percussion, claps and marimba leads", and the latter asserting the "most swag Twice can offer". Following these two are songs written by Twice members, "Cruel" by Dahyun, "Real You" by Jihyo, and "F.I.L.A. (Fall in Love Again)" by Nayeon.

 Title 
The album's title, Formula of Love: O+T=<3, has two meanings according to Twice. The letters O and T represent the initials of Once—the group's official fandom's name—and Twice, respectively, while the heart symbol (<3) represents love; thus, the "formula of love" can be verbalized as "Once plus Twice equals love". The letters O and T also represent the initials of numbers 1 (one) and 2 (two), respectively, while the number 3 in the heart symbol (<3) represents the position of Formula of Love: O+T=<3 in Twice's Korean albums chronology.

 Release and promotion 
On October 20, 2021, during the group's sixth anniversary week, Twice held a livestreaming event titled H6me Party with 6nce, where they sang "Candy", an English song from the album dedicated to their fans. On October 24, JYP Entertainment released a mockumentary-style trailer featuring Twice members dressed up as scientists at the "Twice Love Lab". Twice released several concept photos to promote the album and its title track, "Scientist". In addition to these, teasers for the music video of "Scientist" were released days ahead of its release. Hours before the official release of Formula of Love: O+T=<3, the group went live on YouTube and V Live to discuss the making-of the album.

 Critical reception Formula of Love: O+T=<3 received critical acclaim from music critics who complimented its cohesiveness, consistency, and diversity. On Metacritic, which assigns a normalized rating out of 100 to reviews from professional publications, it received a mean score of 88 based on 5 reviews, indicating "universal acclaim"; it is one the highest-rated K-pop albums on the website.

Writing for Sputnikmusic, Raul Stanciu gave Formula of Love: O+T=<3 a 3.8 out of 5 rating, praising Twice and the album's producers for presenting a "cohesive record", but stressed that it "could have been trimmed to 10 strong cuts". Stanciu also addressed the album's "slight drop in quality" on its second half. Tanu I. Raj of NME gave the album a five-star rating, citing it as a "masterful win befitting [Twice's] global expansion". Raj added that the group's "absolute and unapologetic embracing of their concept has led them to the point where they can subvert it and still be considered credible". South China Morning Posts Tamar Herman noted that "throughout it all, [the album] is a groovy, bouncy addition that feels true to the group while still trying new things." For Beats Per Minute, Chase McMullen rated the album 82 out of 100, applauding Twice's "ability to crank out pop bliss with nearly superhuman speed" and the album's "irresistible eclecticism on display, with each and every track serving as a unique adventure into some different corner." PopMatters critic Ana Clara Ribeiro wrote that the album is a proof for "anyone who ever thought of Twice as one-dimensional or that their 'cute' brand would limit them." AllMusic's David Crone concluded his review by saying the album is Twice's best release to date and that it "surpasses expectations, infusing the group's love-centric lyricism with newfound confidence and creative flair." Rolling Stone Korea called Formula of Love: O+T=<3 "the pinnacle of Twice's career history" and considered it as one of K-pop's best album of 2021.

 Year-end lists 

 Commercial performance 
On November 10, 2021, it was reported that the album had gained over 630,000 pre-order sales by November 8, becoming Twice's most pre-ordered and best-selling album of all-time before its release. By November 10, it had reached over 700,000 pre-order sales. In its first week, MRC Data reported that the album had sold 66,000 album-equivalent units in the United States. Of these, 58,000 were pure sales, 8,000 were streaming-equivalent units, and a negligible amount were track-equivalent units. On January 6, 2022, the Korea Music Content Association (KMCA) certified Formula of Love: O+T=<3 2× Platinum after it sold more than 500,000 units in South Korea.Formula of Love: O+T=<3 debuted at number 1 on South Korea's Gaon Album Chart, making it Twice's tenth number-one album on the chart; following More & More (2020). In Japan, it peaked at number 17 on Billboard Japans Hot Albums chart and at number 2 on Oricon's Albums Chart. The album became Twice's highest-charting album in the US and Canada to date, peaking at numbers 3 and 17 on the Billboard 200 and the Canadian Albums Chart, respectively. In addition to this feat, the album has spent 8 consecutive weeks on the Billboard'' 200. Moreover, on other Billboard charts, the album peaked at numbers 7, 2, and 1 on Tastemakers, Top Album Sales, and World Albums, respectively. In Europe, the album appeared on Belgium's Ultratop Flanders and Wallonia 200 Albums, Finland's Top 50 Albums, Lithuania's Top 100 Albums, the Netherlands' Album Top 100, and the United Kingdom's Album Downloads Chart.

Track listing

Personnel 
Credits adapted from Melon and album liner notes.

Musicians 

 Twice – vocals 
 Chaeyoung – background vocals , lyricist 
 Dahyun – lyricist 
 Jihyo – lyricist , producer 
 Momo – background vocals 
 Nayeon – background vocals , lyricist 
 72 – producer 
 Alexander Pavelich – producer 
 Alma Guðmundsdóttir – producer 
 Anna Timgren – background vocals , lyricist , producer 
 Anne Judith Wik – arranger, producer 
 Anne-Marie – producer 
 Boy Matthews – lyricist 
 Brooke Tomlinson – producer 
 Choi Joon-yeong – bass 
 Coke Paris – arranger, guitar, MIDI programmer, piano, producer 
 Cutfather – arranger, producer 
 Davidior – arranger, lyricist, producer 
 Destiny Rogers – lyricist 
 e.one – arranger, lyricist, keyboard, producer 
 earattack – arranger, producer 
 Ejae – background vocals, producer 
 GG Ramirez – lyricist, producer 
 Gongdo – arranger, producer 
 Jake Torrey – lyricist 
 Jed – lyricist, producer 
 Jenson Vaughan – arranger, producer 
 Jeppe London Bilsby – arranger, producer 
 Jeremy Reeves – producer 
 Jonathan Yip – producer 
 Justin Reinstein – arranger , instrumentation , lyricist , producer , synthesizer 
 Kang Dong-ha – piano 
 Karen Poole – arranger, producer 
 Kim Jong-sung – guitar 
 Kim Myeong-gwan – guitar 
 Lauren Dyson – arranger, producer 
 Lauritz Emil Christiansen – producer 
 Lee Eun-seong – chorus vocals 
 Lee Hae-sol – arranger, instrumentation, keyboard, synthesizer, producer 
 Lee Seu-ran – lyricist 
 Lee Woo-min "collapsedone" – arranger, bass, guitar, instrumentation, lyricist, producer, synthesizer 
 Luke – lyricist 
 Marcus Van Wattum – arranger, producer 
 Master Key – producer 
 Melanie Fontana – background vocals , lyricist , producer 
 Michael Pollack – lyricist 
 Michel "Lindgren" Schulz – arranger, producer , vocal producer 
 Mospick – arranger, lyricist, producer 
 Park Woo-jeong – guitar 
 Ronny Svendsen – arranger, producer 
 R3hab – arranger, producer, remixer 
 Ray Charles McCullough II – producer 
 Ray Romulus – producer 
 Shift K3Y – arranger, lyricist, producer 
 Sim Eun-jee – lyricist , producer 
 Sonny J Mason – arranger, producer 
 Sophia Pae – background vocals , producer 
 Sound Kim – background vocals 
 Steven Franks – arranger, producer 
 The Stereotypes – arranger 
 Tommy Brown – arranger, producer 
 Young Chance – electric piano, lyricist, producer

Technical 

 Coke Paris – vocal editing 
 Choi Hye-jin – recording 
 David K. Younghyun – assistant mixing 
 earattack – vocal director 
 Eom Se-hee – recording 
 Gene Grimaldi – mastering 
 Jeong Yu-ra – digital editing 
 Jiyoung Shin NYC – additional editing , digital editing 
 John Hanes – immersive mixing 
 Justin Reinstein – programmer 
 Kevin "KD" Davis – mixing 
 Kang Dong-ho – assistant mixing 
 Koo Jong-pil – mixing 
 Koo Hye-jin – recording 
 Kwon Nam-woo – mastering 
 Lee Sang-yeop – recording 
 Lee Tae-seop – mixing 
 Lee Woo-min "collapsedone" – programmer, vocal director, vocal editing 
 Park Eun-jeong – mixing 
 R3hab – mastering, mixing, remixer 
 Shin Bong-won – mixing 
 Sim Eun-jee – digital editing, vocal director 
 Sophia Pae – vocal director 
 Tony Maserati – mixing 
 Uncle Joe – mixing

Charts

Weekly charts

Monthly charts

Year-end charts

Certifications and sales 

|}

Release history

See also 
 List of certified albums in South Korea
 List of Gaon Album Chart number ones of 2021
 List of K-pop albums on the Billboard charts

Notes

References 

2021 albums
Twice (group) albums
Korean-language albums
JYP Entertainment albums
Republic Records albums